The 2014 Chrono Gatineau is a one-day women's cycle race held in Canada on 6 June 2014. The race had a UCI rating of 1.1.

Results

See also
 2014 in women's road cycling

References

Chrono Gatineau
Chrono Gatineau
Chrono Gatineau
Chrono Gatineau